Panakhes is a rural locality (an aul) in Afipsipskoye Rural Settlement of Takhtamukaysky District, the Republic of Adygea, Russia. The population was 1,594 as of 2018. There are 35 streets.

Geography 
Panakhes is located 40 km northwest of Takhtamukay (the district's administrative centre) by road. Porono-Pokrovsky is the nearest rural locality.

Ethnicity 
The aul is inhabited by Circassians.

References 

Rural localities in Takhtamukaysky District